
Zgorzelec County is a unit of territorial administration and local government (powiat) in Lower Silesian Voivodeship, Poland. It came into being on January 1, 1999, as a result of the Polish local government reforms passed in 1998. It is situated in the extreme south-west of Poland, bordering both Germany and the Czech Republic. Its administrative seat is Zgorzelec, on the German border; the other towns in the county are Bogatynia, Pieńsk, Zawidów and Węgliniec.

As of 2019 the total population of the county is 89,612. The most populated towns are Zgorzelec with 30,374 inhabitants and Bogatynia with 17,436 inhabitants.

Neighbouring counties
Zgorzelec County is bordered by Żary County and Żagań County to the north, and Bolesławiec County and Lubań County to the east. It also borders the Czech Republic to the south and Germany to the west.

Administrative division
The county is subdivided into seven gminas (two urban, three urban-rural and two rural). These are listed in the following table, in descending order of population.

References

 
Land counties of Lower Silesian Voivodeship